Suphisellus phenax is a species of burrowing water beetle in the subfamily Noterinae. It was described by Guignot in 1954.

References

Suphisellus
Beetles described in 1954